A list of films produced in France in 2000.

References

External links
2000 in France
2000 in French television
French films of 2000 on IMDb
French films of 2000 at Cinema-francais.fr

2000
Films
French